Yunguisaurus is an extinct genus of pistosaur known from the Guizhou Province of China.

Description
Yunguisaurus is known from the holotype NMNS 004529/F003862, an articulated and almost complete skeleton missing only the distal tail. It was collected near Huangnihe River, Chajiang of Guizhou, from the Falang Formation. It is thought to belong to the Paragondolella naantangensis-P. polygnathiformis Assemblage Zone, dating to the Carnian stage of the early Late Triassic. It differs from other pistosauroids by a combination of characters. Nevertheless, its original description is a preliminary report while the postcranial skeleton still waits for further preparation and full description.

Etymology
Yunguisaurus was first named by Yen-Nien Cheng, Tamaki Sato, Xiao-Chun Wu and Chun Li in 2006 and the type species is Yunguisaurus liae. The generic name is derived from the Yungui Gaoyuan, a plateau named after the Yunnan and Guizhou provinces, in which the holotype was found, and saurus, Greek for "lizard". The specific name honors IVPP Professor Jinling Li for contributing to the recent study of the Chinese Triassic marine vertebrate fauna.

References

Fossil taxa described in 2006
Late Triassic reptiles of Asia
Pistosaurs
Triassic sauropterygians
Sauropterygian genera